Robert Songolo Ngijol (born April 20, 1994) is a Cameroonian professional basketball player.

College career 
Songolo Ngijol played college basketball for the UIC Flames (2012–2013) and the Minnesota State–Moorhead Dragons (2013–2016).

Professional career
On November 9, 2017, Songolo Ngijol signed for Zlatibor of the Basketball League of Serbia. On December 3, 2017, he made his debut for Zlatibor in a game against Mladost. He left Zlatibor in May 2018.

In 2019, he signed for ESC Longueau Amiens MSBB of the French 4th-tier Nationale 2. In 2020, he signed for Beaujolais Basket.

International career 
Songolo Ngijol was a member of the Cameroon national basketball team that played at the AfroBasket 2017. Over four tournament games, he averaged 9.3 points, 2.0 rebounds and 2.0 assists per game.

See also 
 List of foreign basketball players in Serbia

References

External links
 Player Profile at eurobasket.com
 Player Profile at realgm.com
 Player Profile at promotex.org

1994 births
Living people
American men's basketball players
American expatriate basketball people in Serbia
American expatriate basketball people in France
American people of Cameroonian descent
Basketball League of Serbia players
Basketball players from Wisconsin
Cameroonian expatriate basketball people in the United States
Cameroonian men's basketball players
Cameroonian expatriate basketball people in Serbia
Cameroonian expatriate basketball people in France
KK Zlatibor players
UIC Flames men's basketball players
Minnesota State–Moorhead Dragons men's basketball players
Sportspeople from Madison, Wisconsin
Basketball players from Yaoundé
Basketball players at the 2018 Commonwealth Games
Point guards
Commonwealth Games competitors for Cameroon